Juliana Suter (born 28 April 1998) is a Swiss alpine skier.

She is the sister of two World Cup alpine skiers Jasmina and Raphaela, who call themselves Suter Sisters Stoos, being originally from the Swiss village Stoos. But she is not related to the skiers Corinne Suter and Fabienne Suter.

Career
During her career, she has achieved two results among the top 15 in the FIS Alpine Ski World Cup.

World Cup results
Top 15

References

External links
 
 

1998 births
Living people
Swiss female alpine skiers